Bülent Turan (born 17 January 1975 in  Çanakkale, Turkey) is a Turkish politician, who currently serves as a member of the Turkish Parliament for the Justice and Development Party.

References 

Justice and Development Party (Turkey) politicians
Living people
1975 births
Eastern Mediterranean University alumni
People from Çanakkale
Turkish expatriates in Northern Cyprus
Çanakkale Onsekiz Mart University alumni
Members of the Grand National Assembly of Turkey